Look Back in Anger is a 1980 British film starring Malcolm McDowell, Lisa Banes and Fran Brill, and directed by Lindsay Anderson and David Hugh Jones. The film is based on John Osborne's play Look Back in Anger.

Plot 
Look Back in Anger is about a love triangle involving an intelligent but disaffected young man Jimmy Porter (Malcolm McDowell), his upper-middle-class, impassive wife Alison Porter (Lisa Banes), and her snooty best friend Helena Charles (Fran Brill). Cliff (Raymond Hardie), an amiable Welsh lodger, attempts to keep the peace.

Cast
 Malcolm McDowell - Jimmy Porter
 Lisa Banes - Alison Porter
 Fran Brill - Helena Charles
 Raymond Hardie - Cliff Lewis
 Robert Burr - Colonel Redfern

Background/Production 
Lindsay Anderson, who had previously worked with Malcolm McDowell on if.... and O Lucky Man!, translated Ted Craig's Roundabout Theatre Company production (in which McDowell was starring) to the screen, and taped results in three days.

References

External links 
 
 

1980 films
1980 drama films
British drama films
1980s English-language films
British films based on plays
Films based on works by John Osborne
Films directed by Lindsay Anderson
Films directed by David Jones
1980s British films